Dinek  is a small town in  Mihalıcçık district of Eskişehir Province,  Turkey. At  it is situated to the south of Sarıyar and Gökçekaya dam reservoirs. The population of Dinek was only  375 as of 2012. Dinek is too small to be a town. But it was more populous back in 1999 when it was declared a seat of township. Since then the town has lost a considerable portion of its population because of migration to cities. According to mayor's page the origin of the town people were the Chepni tribe of Turkmens who had migrated from Greater Khorasan in the 15th century.

References

Populated places in Eskişehir Province
Towns in Turkey
Mıhalıcçık District